Hayes MacArthur (born April 16, 1977) is an American actor and stand-up comedian. He starred in the TBS comedy series Angie Tribeca.

Early life 
MacArthur was born in Chicago to Bruce and Shelley MacArthur. His stepfather is businessman William F. Farley. His younger brother is fellow actor and writer Scott MacArthur.

MacArthur attended Deerfield Academy and received a B.A. in Government from Bowdoin College in Brunswick, Maine, where he was quarterback on the football team. He has studied at the Groundlings Theater Company and Atlantic Theater Company.

Acting career 
MacArthur took first place at the 2003 Rebels of Comedy Competition. He has appeared on such TV shows as Mad TV, Comedy Central's Premium Blend, Pushing Daisies, and Medium.

In 2005, MacArthur co-wrote, produced and starred in a 16-minute short film, The Adventures of Big Handsome Guy and His Little Friend, with Jason Winer. The short was produced as a pilot for TV in 2006. He also appeared as a waiter in the episode of Curb Your Enthusiasm where everyone chooses Larry's wife over him after the break-up. In 2007, MacArthur appeared with fiancée Ali Larter in National Lampoon's Homo Erectus, and also appeared in a comedic supporting role in the Disney movie The Game Plan. Along with recurring roles on the television shows How I Met Your Mother and Worst Week, he appeared in supporting roles in the 2010 films She's Out of My League and Life as We Know It.

In May 2010, NBC announced that MacArthur would star in the television series Perfect Couples.  The half-hour romantic comedy premiered in the second half of the 2010–2011 TV season. The show was cancelled in May 2011.

In 2012, MacArthur was featured in several episodes of Whitney, as well as Go On and the Broken Lizard film The Babymakers.

Personal life 
MacArthur's first name was in honor of his great-aunt, actress Helen Hayes, who was married to Charles MacArthur, his grandfather Alexander MacArthur's brother.

MacArthur became engaged to Heroes actress Ali Larter, his girlfriend of three years, in December 2007. On August 1, 2009, MacArthur married Larter in a small ceremony at his parents' estate in Kennebunk, Maine. On July 20, 2010, it was announced that the couple were expecting their first child. Larter and MacArthur have a son Theodore Hayes McArthur born on December 20, 2010, and daughter Vivienne Margaret born on January 15, 2015. The couple also have two dogs, Jackpot and Ella.

Filmography

References

External links 

Comedy Central page

1977 births
Living people
American male comedians
American male television actors
American male film actors
Bowdoin College alumni
Bowdoin Polar Bears football players
Male actors from Chicago
21st-century American male actors
Comedians from Illinois
21st-century American comedians